Power Stroke is the name used by a family of diesel engines for trucks produced by Ford Motor Company and Navistar International (until 2010) for Ford products since 1994. Along with its use in the Ford F-Series (including the Ford Super Duty trucks), applications include the Ford E-Series, Ford Excursion, and Ford LCF commercial truck. The name was also used for a diesel engine used in South American production of the Ford Ranger.

From 1994, the Power Stroke engine family existed as a re-branding of engines produced by Navistar International, sharing engines with its medium-duty truck lines. Since the 2011 introduction of the 6.7 L Power Stroke V8, Ford has designed and produced its own diesel engines.  During its production, the PowerStroke engine range has been marketed against large-block V8 (and V10) gasoline engines along with the General Motors Duramax V8 and the Dodge Cummins B-Series inline-six.

Engine family list

7.3 Power Stroke

The first engine to bear the Power Stroke name, the 7.3 L Power Stroke V8 is the Ford version of the Navistar T444E turbo-diesel V8. Introduced in 1994 as the replacement for the 7.3 L IDI V8, the Power Stroke/T444E is a completely new design, with only its bore and stroke dimensions common with its predecessor (resulting in its identical  displacement). In line with the IDI diesel, the Power Stroke was offered in three-quarter-ton and larger versions of the Ford F-Series and Econoline product ranges.

The 1994.5 to 1996/97 DI Power Stroke has "single shot" HEUI (hydraulically actuated electronic unit injection) fuel injectors which were AA code injectors unless from California where as they received AB code injectors. It ran a high pressure oil pump (HPOP) to create the necessary oil pressure to fire the fuel injectors. This generation of Power Stroke utilizes an HPOP with a 15° swash plate angle. The 1995-1997 trucks use a two-stage cam-driven fuel pump, whereas the 1999-2003 trucks use a frame rail mounted electric fuel pump. The 1999–2003 trucks also had a deadhead fuel system and a "long lead" injector in cyl. number 8 due to lower fuel pressures with the deadhead design (AE code injector). The California trucks from 1996 and 1997 have a  split-shot fuel injectors; other trucks did not get split-shot injectors until 1999. Single-shot injectors only inject one charge of fuel per cycle, whereas the split-shot injector releases a preliminary light load before the main charge to initiate combustion in a more damped manner. This "pre-injection" helps reduce the sharp combustion 'knock' as well as lower NOx emissions by creating a more complete burn.

The '94.5-'97 engine utilizes a single turbocharger, non-wastegated, with a turbine housing size of 1.15 A/R. In 1999, an air-to-air intercooler was added to cool the charged air from the turbo for increased air density. With the new cooler, denser air would increase the horsepower potential of the engine, while also reducing exhaust gas temperatures (EGT). The turbine housing was changed to a .84 A/R and a wastegate was added halfway through the 1999 model year. With the larger injectors, the HPOP capability was increased by utilizing a 17° swash plate angle to meet the requirements of the new, higher flowing injectors.

The engine used forged connecting rods until powdered metal rods were introduced for early 2002 models. Serial numbers can be seen with the aid of a borescope to confirm the changeover between the 2001 and 2002 model years. These new connecting rods sufficed in an unmodified engine, but would become a potentially catastrophic failure point if aftermarket tuning pushed the engine above .  Early models did not use any form of exhaust aftertreatment, such as a catalytic converter, as emissions were not enforced on diesel motors; however, by mid-year 2002, Ford began installing catalytic converters as part of the OEM exhaust as part of the Tier 1–3 standards.

Common issues

Despite being regarded as one of the most reliable diesel engines ever put in a light-duty truck, the engine had its own issues. A common failure point was the camshaft position sensor (CPS). The failure of this sensor would cause a no-start condition or a stall while running. The easiest way to diagnose a failed CPS is through movement of the tachometer when cranking. If the tachometer does not move, the CPS is most likely bad. The fuel filter/water separator also tends to be a minor failure point across the trucks. The filter housing tends to develop cracks in the aluminum housing and leaks fuel. The heating element contained in the filter housing also can short out, blowing a fuse and causing a no start condition. The turbocharger up-pipes are a large failure point, with the pipes leaking from many different points but mainly from the joints. Leaking of the up-pipes causes the engine to lose boost and cause exhaust gas temperatures to increase. The EBPV exhaust back-pressure valve (EBPV) was also prone to failure; it could close when cold and get stuck on causing a jet engine like noise coming from the exhaust.

Most of the issues that came out of these motors were due to poor electrical connections. The UVCH (under valve cover harness) was prone to losing contact with either glow plugs or injectors which caused rough starts or a misfire depending on the year. 1994–1997 engines have two connectors going into each bank, whereas 1999–2003 engines had one connector going into each bank; troubleshooting the harness was easier for the 1994–1997 engines.

The 7.3 L DI Power Stroke was in production until the first quarter of model year 2003, when it was replaced by the 6.0 L because of its inability to meet California noise regulations, not the commonly believed emissions standards. Nearly 2 million 7.3 L DI Power Stroke engines were produced in International's Indianapolis plant.

The 7.3 L DI Power Stroke engine is commonly referred to as one of the best engines that International produced.

6.0 Power Stroke

The  Power Stroke was replaced by the  beginning in the second quarter of the 2003 model year. The 6.0L Power Stroke, was used in Ford Super Duty trucks until the 2007 model year but lasted until 2009 in the Ford Econoline vans (model year 2010) and in the Ford Excursion SUVs until after the 2005 models when Ford discontinued Excursion production. It utilizes a variable-geometry turbocharger and intercooler, producing  and  torque with an 18.0:1 compression ratio, with fuel cutoff at 4,200 rpm. Many 6.0 L Power Stroke engines experienced problems.

Key specifications
 Fuel injection system: Split-shot HEUI (hydraulically actuated electronically controlled unit injectors)
 Valve train: OHV 4-valves per cylinder, 32 valves total (16 intake valves, 16 exhaust valves)
 Turbo configuration: Single; variable vane geometry (VGT)

Common issues
/ - The sources of the main issues with the 6.0L were the in-block oil cooler, and the EGR cooler materials. The oil cooler is located in the valley of the engine block, underneath the cartridge oil filter set up. The sealed outer portion of the oil cooler is submerged in engine oil, with coolant flowing through the center passages. Over time, the coolant side of oil cooler would plug up with sediment.  This would reduce the flow of coolant through the oil cooler and cause higher oil temperatures.  This sediment would also reduce the flow of coolant through the EGR cooler resulting in premature failure due to thermal expansion fatiguing the heat exchanging core.  The early EGR coolers (2003-2004.5) were also susceptible to premature failure.

 -  With the use of Split-shot HEUI fuel injectors, high pressure oil is required to pressurize the fuel injectors. The main high pressure oil (HPO) system components are; High Pressure Oil Pump (HPOP), HPO manifolds, Stand pipes and branch tube. The HPOP is located in the engine valley at the rear of the engine block. Early build years (2003.5–04.5) are well known for premature HPOP failure. This is due to the poor quality materials used in manufacturing. The HPOP is pressurized by a rotating gear, meshed with a rear camshaft gear. The early model HPOP gears were known to be weak, and develop stress cracks in the teeth resulting in gear failure, thus causing a no start issue for the engine. Early models also had the ICP sensor located on the HPOP cover. The high amount of heat in this location, combined with the exposure to debris in the oil was known to cause ICP sensor failure also resulting in a no start condition. This issue was addressed by Ford with the late 2004 engine update, bringing a new HPOP design, along with relocation of the ICP sensor to the Passenger side valve cover. The newly designed pump is not known for frequent failure, however a new issue arose with the update. In the late model engines, Ford also redesigned the HPO stand pipes and dummy plugs in the HPO manifold, using poor quality o-rings. These o-rings were prone to failure causing a HPO leak, and eventually a no start condition. Ford addressed this concern with updated Viton o-ring washers fixing the issue. With the new HPO system design also came a Snap To Connect (STC) fitting. Some models had issue with the prongs of the STC fitting breaking causing the fitting to lose its sealing property and again, a no start condition for the engine. Another frequent (but not always catastrophic) issue with the HPO system is the Injection Pressure Regulator (IPR) screen. The IPR screen is located in the engine valley with the oil cooler. The material used was susceptible to failure and neglecting to replace the screen during an oil cooler replacement could lead to the debris being sent through the HPOP causing complete failure. If the HPOP does not fail another common failure point is the IPR that, if contaminated by debris, will not be able to seal completely and will then "bleed off" oil pressure causing a no start condition.

 - Ford/International used four Torque to Yield (TTY) cylinder head bolts per cylinder for the 6.0s and 6.4s. TTY bolts offer some of the most precise clamping force available but can be problematic. In certain situations (Oil cooler/EGR cooler failure, high boost/load levels brought on by performance upgrades) TTY bolts can be stretched beyond their torque mark by increased cylinder pressures (commonly from coolant being introduced into the cylinder). This has never been addressed by Ford due to the fact that other malfunctions or abuse must occur to stretch the bolts. Some in the aftermarket will replace the factory bolts with head studs in an attempt to protect the head gaskets from future failure. If this is done without addressing the underlying issue, the head gaskets may fail again bringing along a cracked or warped cylinder head. In contrast, the Powerstroke 7.3s and 6.7s have 6 head bolts per cylinder while the 6.0, VT365, IDI 7.3s and 6.4s  only have four.

Electrical and fuel
Numerous PCM recalibrations, attempts to "detune" the engine, fuel injector stiction (caused by lack of maintenance and proper oil changes) along with several other driveability and quality control problems have plagued the 6.0. The FICM (fuel injection control module) has been a problem, where low voltage in the vehicle's electrical system due to failing batteries or a low-output alternator can cause damage to the FICM. In addition, the placement of the FICM on top of the engine subjects it to varying and extreme temperatures and vibrations causing solder joints and components to fail in early build models; mostly in the power supply itself. The FICM multiplies the voltage in the fuel injector circuit from 12 to 48-50 volts to fire the injectors. Low voltage can eventually cause damage to the fuel injectors.

Lawsuits and litigation
Many 6.0 owners who bought their truck new have received class action lawsuit payments. Some owners have opted out of the class action lawsuit and went straight to a fraud case: one example is Charles Margeson of California,  who was awarded $214,537.34 plus legal fees ($72,564.04 was for repayment of his 2006 F-350).  Margeson, along with 5 other owners who opted out of the class action lawsuits, have been awarded over US$10 million.

6.4 Power Stroke

The 6.4L Power Stroke was introduced for MY2008 and was the first engine introduced to the light truck market that utilized dual turbochargers directly from the factory. Additionally, this was the first Power Stroke to use a diesel particulate filter (DPF) to reduce particulate matter emissions from the exhaust. The new DPF and active regeneration system greatly hindered fuel economy and the engine was ultimately retired after MY2010 and replaced by the 6.7L Power Stroke built in-house by Ford. While warranty claims began to show a level of unreliability similar to the previous 6.0L Power Stroke, the 6.4L Power Stroke has proved to be capable of handling elevated boost levels needed to generate high horsepower and torque.

Horsepower and torque are achieved at 3,000 rpm and 2,000 rpm respectively. It also features a compound VGT turbo system. Air enters the low-pressure turbo (the larger of the two) and is fed into the high-pressure turbo (the smaller of the two), then is directed into the engine or intercooler. This system is designed to result in reduced turbo lag when accelerating from a stop. The series-turbo system is set up to provide a better throttle response while in motion to give a power flow more like a naturally aspirated engine. The 6.4 L also has a DPF and dual EGR coolers which are capable of reducing exhaust gas temps by up to 1,000 degrees before they reach the EGR valve and mix with the intake charge. The DPF traps soot and particulates from the exhaust and virtually eliminates the black smoke that most diesel engines expel upon acceleration. The engine computer is programmed to periodically inject extra fuel in the exhaust stroke of the engine (which is called a DPF Regen or regeneration) to burn off soot that accumulates in the DPF. This engine is designed to only run on ultra low sulfur diesel (ULSD) fuel which has no more than 15 ppm sulfur content; using regular diesel fuel results in emission equipment malfunctions and violates manufacturer warranties.

The 6.4L has had one recall (safety product recall 07S49 was released on March 23, 2007) that addresses the potential for flames to come from the tailpipe of the truck. This problem arises from the DPF which is part of the diesel after-treatment system. A PCM recalibration was released to eliminate the possibility of excessive exhaust temperatures combined with certain rare conditions resulting from what is becoming known as a "thermal event".

Key specifications
 Fuel injection system: High pressure common rail
 Valve train: OHV 4-valve
 Compound VGT turbo
 DPF
 Advanced multi-shot piezoelectric fuel injection control

Common issues
 Piston ring failures in #7 and #8 cylinders due to regeneration process. During regeneration, fuel is injected during the exhaust stroke in order to increase the exhaust temperature for DPF cleaning.  This exposes the piston rings to excessive heat which eventually causes the piston rings to lose tension, causing low to no compression (compression skip) and excessive blow-by.  
 Rocker arm tips impacting (especially on lower geared trucks) due to higher pressure on valve-train (that was not upgraded from the 6.0 liter engine design) after .
 Turbo-charger bearing seal failures (which in turn allows engine lubricating oil to leak past the bearing seal) due to regeneration process pushing high exhaust temperatures thru the turbo-charger. This condition will precipitate premature clogging of the DPF, which then causes the engine to stay in regeneration mode. If this condition is not corrected quickly, the leaking seal will eventually allow all the engine oil to be pumped out of the engine through the exhaust, causing complete engine failure due to lack of lubrication.
 Higher incidents of cavitation erosion of the front cover due to the larger water pump impeller speed, causing coolant to leak into engine oil.
 EGR cooler failures allowing engine coolant to flow back into #8 cylinder while engine is shut off, which causes the cylinder to hydro-lock and possibly bend the piston connecting rod as well as other damage to engine when it is subsequently started.
 Cylinder head valve-guides do not have bronze sleeves, which allows for excessive wear and oil leakage around the valves.
Connecting rods do not have bronze bushings where the piston wrist pin goes thru the connecting rod.  This also allows for excessive wear and noise on higher mileage vehicles.
 If aftermarket tuning is installed that introduces too much advanced fuel injection timing, cracking of the cylinder heads can result due to excessive combustion temperatures.
 Very high cost of service and repair parts compared to other versions of the Power Stroke.
Siemens K16 High Pressure Fuel Pump had a problem of self destruction in the 6.4L Powerstroke. When the pump destroyed itself, shrapnel would almost always be sent to all eight injectors, basically rendering them just as useless as the destoyed pump. On occasion, an injector may become stuck open and burn a piston crown, resulting in more repair work. 
Cracking pistons was a problem and usually started on the thin edge of the fuel bowl on the pistons. It occurred more frequently in high-mileage engines, and if left untreated for too long, more engine damage could occur.

6.7 Power Stroke
The 6.7 L Power Stroke debuted in the 2011 Ford Super Duty (F-250 through F-550) trucks, replacing the 6.4 L Power Stroke. The first Power Stroke engine to be developed and manufactured by Ford, it was designed in conjunction with AVL of Austria. During its development, Ford engineers codenamed this engine "Scorpion" because of the exhaust manifold and turbocharger being mounted in the engine's "valley." The system delivers up to five injection events per cylinder per cycle using eight-hole piezo injectors spraying fuel into the piston bowl. This engine also supports B20 biodiesel, allowing fueling options of up to 20 percent biodiesel and 80 percent petroleum diesel. Garrett's single-sequential turbocharger features an industry-first double-sided compressor wheel mounted on a single shaft. The engine block is cast by Tupy, which also does the initial machining. The connecting rods are made by Mahle.

Emissions controls include exhaust gas recirculation, Denoxtronic-based selective catalytic reduction (SCR) from Bosch, and a DPF. Ford claimed the bump in horsepower is from a new turbocharger, new injector nozzles, and exhaust improvements. Previously, the Duramax motor had a  gain over the Power Stroke in 2017, and the Cummins engine for 2018 would have had a  torque gain over the Power Stroke if the Power Stroke's output hadn't been increased for 2018. The engine is also available for Blue Bird Vision school buses. As of 2020, the Power Stroke's output was increased to 475 hp at 2600 rpm and 1050 lb-ft at 1600 rpm, becoming the best-in-class diesel in horsepower.

Key specifications
 Diesel particulate filter
 Valve train: OHV 4-valve
 Turbo configuration: 'GT32 SST (single sequential turbocharger)' --single  turbine and dual-sided compressor
 Fuel injection system: High-pressure common rail, Bosch CP4 injection pump, piezo electric injectors

2015–2016

3.2 Power Stroke

The 3.2 L Power Stroke is an inline-five engine that debuted in the U.S.-spec Transit for model year 2015. The engine is a modified version of the Ford Duratorq 3.2 L diesel engine that has been adapted to meet emissions in the United States. To aid in economy, emissions, and reduce NVH, it has a high pressure common rail fuel injection system and piezo injectors that can spray up to five different injections per compression event. It has a water cooled EGR system to reduce the temperature of the exhaust gas before being recirculated through the intake. A unique feature to the emissions system is that the diesel oxidation catalyst (DOC) and the DPF have been combined into one singular unit as opposed to the traditional two separate units. Exhaust treatment continues with SCR which is done by the injection of diesel exhaust fluid in the exhaust to reduce NOx. The engine features a variable geometry turbo which allows for intake air flow tuning on the fly to increase power and fuel economy. The engine also features a variable-flow oil pump to avoid wasting mechanical energy pumping excessive amounts of oil. It has cast aluminum, low friction pistons with oil squirters to keep them cool during heavy-load conditions, a die cast aluminum cam carrier to stiffen up the valve train and reduce NVH, and to increase low end durability, the crankshaft is cast iron and the connecting rods are forged. The block itself is an extra rigid, gray cast iron with a closed deck.

Key specifications
Fuel injection system: High pressure common rail
Valve train:  DOHC 4-valve
Turbo configuration: Single variable geometry turbo
Combined diesel particulate filter and diesel oxidation catalyst
Urea injected selective catalytic reduction

3.0 Power Stroke

A 3.0 liter Power Stroke turbo-diesel V6 was introduced in the 2018 Ford F-150 to compete with the Ram 1500 EcoDiesel V6. EPA-estimated fuel efficiency ratings are  highway,  city, and  combined. It continued to be offered until the 2021 model year.

Applications
The Power Stroke engine has been used in the following applications.

Ford E-Series (full-size vans)
 1995–2003 7.3 L
 2004–2010 6.0 L

Ford Excursion (full-size sport utility vehicles)
 2000–2003 7.3 L
 2003.5–2005 6.0 L

Ford F-Series (full-size pickup trucks)
 Mid-1994–Mid-2003 7.3 L
 Mid-2003–2007 6.0 L
 2008–2010 6.4 L
 2011–present 6.7 L
 2018–2021 3.0 L (F-150 only)

Ford F-Series (medium duty trucks)
 2016–present 6.7 L

LCF (low cab forward)
 2005–2010 4.5 L

Ford Transit
 2015–present 3.2 L

Other engines with the Power Stroke name
In South American models, the 2001–2012 Ford Ranger used a Power Stroke engine in their diesel versions. It has only the block and connect-rods in common with 2.8L Power Stroke.
The above-detailed 3.2L Duratorq I5 is branded as Power Stroke in US-spec Ford Transit vans.
The 4.5-liter Power Stroke was a V6 Power Stroke with the same turbo design as a 6.4 liter. The geometry of the engines is the same as the 6.0l minus 2 cylinders. The 4.5L and 6.0L share some of the same engine parts.

See also
 Ford engines
 Ford Modular engine

References

External links
 Powerstroke Diesel home page
 Navistar International
 Power Stroke Diesel Specs

Power Stroke
Navistar engines
Diesel engines by model
Straight-five engines
V6 engines
V8 engines